Veedekkadi Mogudandi...! is a 2001 Indian Telugu-language comedy drama film directed by E. V. V. Satyanarayana. The film stars Venu Thottempudi and Shruthi Raj. The film's musical score is by Koti, and the film released on 15 November 2001.

Plot 
An astrologer claims that Sriram's wife will die during childbirth so he decides to remain a bachelor but his family get him married to Sruthi who then gets pregnant. Whether she survive the pregnancy or not forms the rest of the story.

Cast 
 Venu Thottempudi as Sriram
 Shruthi Raj as Sruti (Voice dubbed by Sunitha Upadrashta)
 Geetu Mohandas as Sruthi's younger sister
 Kota Srinivasa Rao as Sriram's father
 Brahmanandam
 Chandra Mohan
 Mallikarjuna Rao as the astrologer
 Ali as Sruthi's cousin
 M. S. Narayana as Sruthi's father
 A. V. S. as Sastry
 Chalapathi Rao as doctor

Production 
This film marks the return of E. V. V. Satyanarayana to the comedy genre after [ammo okato tariku]] and Maa Aavida Meeda Vottu Mee Aavida Chala Manchidi.

Reception 
Gudipoodi Srihari of The Hindu wrote that "The strength of the film is its dialogue by Marudhuri Raja and his associates, which is the main vehicle of humor. Comedy is EVV's forte and director seems to be comfortable". Jeevi of Idlebrain gave the film a rating of 3.25/5 and opined that "This is a 'must-watch' film for all the EVV movie lovers". Smriti Kashyap of Full Hyderabad stated that the performances of the actors were wooden and criticised the lack of a proper story.

Box office 
The film was a box office failure.

References

External links 

2000s Telugu-language films
2001 films
Films directed by E. V. V. Satyanarayana
2001 comedy-drama films
Indian comedy-drama films